The 1966 Tasman Championship for Drivers was a motor racing competition for racing cars complying with the Tasman Formula. The championship was jointly organised by the Association of New Zealand Car Clubs Inc. and the Confederation of Australian Motor Sport. It began on 8 January 1966 and ended on 7 March after eight races, four of which were staged in New Zealand and the remainder in Australia. The winning driver was declared Tasman Champion and was awarded the Tasman Cup.

The championship, which was the third Tasman Series, was won by Jackie Stewart driving a BRM P261.

Races

The championship was contested over eight races.

Points system 
Points were awarded on the following basis at each race.

Each driver could retain points won in the New Zealand Grand Prix and in any other two races in New Zealand plus points won in the Australian Grand Prix and in any in other two races in Australia.

Championship standings

References

External links
 Tasman Series 1966, www.sergent.com.au

1966
Tasman Series
Tasman Series